The year 1953 saw a number of significant happenings in radio broadcasting history.

Events
1 January – In Ireland Erskine Childers, the Minister for Posts and Telegraphs, appoints a new executive council, Comhairle Radio Éireann, to take over day-to-day responsibility for the state broadcasting service.
15 January – Harry Truman becomes the first President of the United States to broadcast his farewell address on radio and television.
19 March – For the first time the Academy Awards ceremony (broadcast annually on radio since 1930) is also carried on television.
3 May – German international broadcaster Deutsche Welle begins regular transmissions.

Debuts
1 January – Cathy and Elliott Lewis on Stage debuts on CBS.
7 January – The Crime Files of Flamond debuts on Mutual. 
15 January – Time for Love debuted on CBS.
8 February – Hallmark Hall of Fame debuts on CBS. 
8 June – Family Skeleton debuts on CBS. 
5 July – Confession debuted on NBC. 
21 July – The Baron and the Bee debuts on NBC. 
20 September – The Six Shooter debuts on NBC.
23 October – House of Glass returns after an 18-year hiatus, this time on NBC. 
3 November – To Be Perfectly Frank debuts on NBC.

Closings
(undated) – Bright Star ends its run in syndication by Ziv Company. 
16 January – Your Hit Parade ends its run on network radio (NBC). 
30 January – This Is Your FBI ends its run on network radio (ABC) 
1 February – Hallmark Playhouse ends its run on network radio (CBS). 
3 March – Life with Luigi ends its run on CBS.
31 March – Cavalcade of America (1935–1953) ends its run on NBC. 
18 April – The Affairs of Peter Salem ends its run on network radio (Mutual). 
19 April – The Aldrich Family ends its run on network radio (NBC). 
5 June – Aunt Jemima ends its run on network radio (CBS). 
28 June – The Chase ends its run on network radio (NBC).
19 July – Jason and the Golden Fleece ends its run on network radio (NBC).
27 July – The Bob Hawk Show ends its run on network radio (CBS). 
5 September – Archie Andrews ends its run on network radio (NBC). 
6 September – December Bride ends its run on network radio (CBS). 
13 September – Confession ends its run on network radio (NBC). 
27 September – The First Nighter Program ends its run on network radio (NBC). 
27 September – Best Plays ends its run on network radio (NBC). 
19 November – Father Knows Best ends its run on network radio (NBC).

Births
6 January – Paul Mayhew-Archer, English comedy writer and producer.
22 February – Geoffrey Perkins, English comedy producer (d. 2008). 
3 October – Buzz Burbank, American newsman for The Don and Mike Show from 2 December 1991.
Bob Cruz, American disc jockey, hired to replace Jay Reynolds at WABC in 1976 (d. 1995).

Deaths
9 November – Dylan Thomas, Welsh poet and radio broadcaster (b. 1914).

References

 
Radio
Radio by year
Radio stations established in 1953